Tilo Wolff (born 10 July 1972) is a German musician and artist. He was born in Frankfurt am Main and currently lives in Switzerland.
 
His longest-running project is the band Lacrimosa, which debuted in 1990. The band embraces a diverse range of gothic, darkwave and orchestral musical styles. Wolff composes, arranges, and writes the lyrics for almost all of Lacrimosa's songs. He also sings and plays piano for the songs and has contributed to the design of the album sleeves' designs.

The same year Lacrimosa was founded, Wolff founded the independent record label, "Hall of Sermon" to finance Lacrimosa without being dependent on outside record companies. Hall of Sermon now has eight darkwave bands other than Lacrimosa on its books, including Dreams of Sanity and Girls Under Glass.

In 2004, Wolff founded Snakeskin, another band, which diverts significantly from Lacrimosa's music.

Wolff was also the manager of the German band Cinema Bizarre. He also DJs, playing festivals and clubs across Europe.

Discography

Lacrimosa albums

Studio albums

Live albums

Compilations

References

External links
Lacrimosa
Snakeskin
Hall of Sermon

1972 births
Living people
German male singers
German rock singers
Gothic rock musicians
German singer-songwriters
German expatriates in Switzerland
Musicians from Frankfurt
German electronic musicians
20th-century German male singers
20th-century German male pianists
21st-century German male singers
21st-century German male pianists